Route 776 is a provincial highway in New Brunswick, Canada. It serves as the main road on Charlotte County's Grand Manan Island, following the entire eastern coast of the island.

The northern terminus of Route 776 is at the Coastal Transport Limited ferry terminal at the top of Ferry Wharf Road in the community of North Head.  The southern terminus is at Southwest Head at the Southwest Light, a Canadian Coast Guard light station atop  cliffs.

Between these locations, the road passes through (from north to south) Castalia, Woodwards Cove, Grand Harbour, Seal Cove, and Deep Cove.

The community of Ingalls Head is the only major population centre on Grand Manan Island not having direct access to Route 776; one must drive down Ingalls Head Road in Grand Harbour to access this village. In addition, the offshore inhabited island of White Head Island cannot be directly accessed by Route 776 as well.

Route 776 has no colloquial names, and islanders refer to it by its official route number, or the "main road".

References

New Brunswick provincial highways
Roads in Charlotte County, New Brunswick